Henry Noble Couden (November 21, 1842 – August 22, 1922) was a Universalist minister who was the 54th Chaplain of the United States House of Representatives from December 2, 1895, to February 21, 1921. He was the second blind religious leader to serve in this position, the other is William Henry Milburn.

Birth
He was born on November 21, 1842, in Plymouth, Indiana, the nephew of Noah Noble, governor of Indiana.

Civil War
Days after the outbreak of the American Civil War, on 16 April 1861, he enlisted in the 6th Regiment, Ohio Volunteer Infantry, serving in Company K, with the rank of corporal upon entering and the rank of sergeant upon leaving. He was also a corporal in Company D, 1st Cavalry Battalion, Mississippi Marine Brigade. He was wounded at the Battle of Beaver Dam Lake on May 24, 1863, losing his sight. He described his activity during this battle in a 24 January 1903 letter to Warren D. Crandall, author of History of the Ram Fleet and Mississippi Marine Brigade.

Education and ordination
He studied at the State School for the Blind in Columbus, Ohio, and the Divinity School of St. Lawrence University. He graduated from St. Lawrence in 1878 and was ordained to the Universalist ministry that same year.

Career

Universalist minister
After his ordination, he served churches in Madrid, New York; Willoughby, Ohio; Chatham, Massachusetts; and Port Huron, Michigan.

Chaplain of the U.S. House of Representatives
He became chaplain of the U.S. House of Representatives in 1895 and served in that post for 25 years, until February 21, 1921.

A collection of his daily opening prayers for the 62nd Congress was issued in 1913. In his foreword, Rep. Champ Clark praised Couden's "prayers of excellent character, in both form and matter ... full of piety, sympathy, and philanthropy ... voiced in choice English".

Other service
He was a member of the board of directors of the Aid Association for the Blind of the District of Columbia. He served in post and departmental chaplaincies for the Grand Army of the Republic and as the chaplain for the Society of Marine Brigade Survivors.

Death
He died on August 22, 1922, at his residence at Fort Myer, Virginia, of bronchial pneumonia, after a nine-month illness. He was buried at Arlington National Cemetery, in Arlington, Virginia. along with his second wife, Harriet Dunbar Couden, and one of his two sons, Henry N. Couden, Jr.

References

External links
 
 

1842 births
1922 deaths
19th-century Christian universalists
20th-century Christian universalists
Theological School of St. Lawrence University alumni
Chaplains of the United States House of Representatives
Clergy of the Universalist Church of America
People from Plymouth, Indiana
Blind clergy
American blind people
Burials at Arlington National Cemetery
Grand Army of the Republic officials